Isaac Jeffrey Eric Aubynn (born 12 May 1977) is a Swedish professional football coach and former player of Ghanaian descent who played as a midfielder. Starting in 2023, he will be the head coach at Superettan club Örgryte IS. He played in Sweden, Germany, Denmark, and Norway during a career that spanned between 1997 and 2014. He won seven caps for the Sweden national team between 2001 and 2007.

Club career

Early career 
Born in Göteborg, Aubynn started his career in Gunnilse IS where he played until 1997 when German giants Bayern Munich signed him, after one year in the Bundesliga he returned to Sweden and Halmstads BK in 1998.

Halmstad BK 
He stayed with HBK for 2 seasons, winning Allsvenskan in 2000, before he signed for Allsvenskan rivals Örgryte IS in 2001, in 2003 he moved to the Danish Danish Superliga and the club AGF, he stayed in Denmark until 2005 when he signed for the Stockholm club Hammarby IF, in 2006 he got into a disagreement about signing a new contract with Hammarby

Aalesunds FK 
He was eventually sold in 2007 to the Norwegian club Aalesund where he signed a contract until the end of the season. He helped Aalesund from relegation threat, scoring 5 and assisting 2 in the process. He left the club after the season as agreed in order to find himself a bigger club.

Malmö FF 
In December rumors surfaced linking Aubynn with Swedish club Malmö FF. He eventually signed a two-year contract with the team. Aubynn stayed in Malmö FF for four seasons before leaving the club in December 2011 after coming to a mutual agreement with the club not to renew his contract. Whilst playing for Malmo FF, he won the Allsvenskan in 2010 for the second in his career after 10 years of winning it with Halmstad BK.

International career
Aubynn has represented both the U-21 and the Swedish national team, on 14 February 2001 he played in his debut for the Blågult at King's Cup.

Managerial career

First step into coaching 
Aubynn went into coaching after he retired from football. With his first official appointment being given the role to coach Malmo FF U17 youth team. He was subsequently promoted to the U19 team in 2018.

In December 2020, the Swedish top-flight side, Malmö FF announced the appointment of Aubynn as assistant coach to Jon Dahl Tomasson. The former Malmo FF midfielder replaced Daniel Bäckström, who left for IK Sirius. Aubynn was promoted from the club's U19 team, where he served as head coach for 2 years.

Career statistics

Honours
;Halmstad BK
Allsvenskan: 2000
Malmö FF
Allsvenskan: 2010

Footnotes

External links
 Malmö FF profile 
 
 

1977 births
Living people
Swedish people of Ghanaian descent
Swedish footballers
Sweden international footballers
Sweden under-21 international footballers
Association football midfielders
FC Bayern Munich II players
Halmstads BK players
Örgryte IS players
Hammarby Fotboll players
Malmö FF players
Aalesunds FK players
Aarhus Gymnastikforening players
Danish Superliga players
Allsvenskan players
Eliteserien players
Regionalliga players
Swedish expatriate footballers
Ghanaian expatriate sportspeople in Denmark
Expatriate footballers in Germany
Expatriate men's footballers in Denmark
Expatriate footballers in Norway
Swedish expatriate sportspeople in Norway
Swedish expatriate sportspeople in Denmark
Swedish expatriate sportspeople in Germany
Footballers from Gothenburg